I'm OK, You're OK is the third studio album by Jason Falkner, released in Japan on April 30, 2007, on Noise McCartney Records.

A U.S. version was released on February 16, 2010.  This edition featured two differences from the Japanese release, an entirely new version of "This Time" and a different mix on "The Knew."  It was also increased in volume 4.5 dB although the mastering EQ stayed the same. It is available in both CD and double vinyl formats.

Track listing

Personnel
Jason Falkner - vocals, instruments, production
Jeremy Stacy - drums on "Runaway"
Christy Hindenlang - background vocals on "NYC"

Production
Jason Falkner - production, mixing, art direction, photography
Mathieu Bitton - art direction, design
Jason Cupp - studio assistance
Alan Yoshida - mastering

Written, produced and mixed at Rhetoric Studios, 2001-2007
Mastered at Ocean Way Mastering

References

External links
Jason Falkner’s Official Website

2008 albums
Jason Falkner albums